Police Story 3: Supercop, released as Supercop in the US, is a 1992 Hong Kong action film starring Jackie Chan and Michelle Yeoh. Jackie reprises his "Kevin" Chan Ka-Kui character, a Hong Kong cop from Police Story and Police Story 2. It is the third installment of the Police Story series, as well as first in Police Story franchise not to be directed by Jackie, with Stanley Tong taking over the helm. It is also the last appearance in the series for Maggie Cheung as Jackie's girlfriend, May.

Plot
Ka-Kui is the "supercop" of the Hong Kong police with amazing martial arts skills. He is sent to Guangzhou, where the Chinese police force's Interpol director, Inspector Jessica Yang, briefs him on his next assignment. The target is Chaibat, a drug lord based in Hong Kong. To infiltrate Chaibat's organization, Ka-Kui is to get close to Chaibat's henchman Panther, who is in a Chinese prison. Ka-Kui, posing as a petty criminal prisoner, manages Panther's escape with the connivance of the guards. Grateful, Panther invites Ka-Kui to go with him to Hong Kong and join Chaibat's gang. Panther meets up with some of his other men, and vouches for Ka-Kui. The group heads for Hong Kong.

On the way, they pass through Ka-Kui's supposed home village, and Panther insists that Ka-Kui visit his family there. He does not actually know anyone in the village, but is pleasantly relieved to be greeted by undercover police posing as his family, with Yang as his sister. The local police pretend to arrest Ka-Kui in a restaurant, but Ka-Kui and Yang (also a martial-arts expert) escape after a big fight, which concludes with the faked killing of a policeman. This confirms Panther's trust in them.

In Hong Kong, Chaibat welcomes Ka-Kui and Yang to his luxurious hide-out. He takes them with him to a big opium grower's fortified compound in the Golden Triangle military camp of Thailand, for a meeting of big-time heroin traffickers. During the meeting, Chaibat's gang attack from outside while Ka-Kui and Yang protect him inside. In a huge gun battle, Chaibat's gang kill the rival traffickers and their guards, and smash up the compound. The grower survives, but will now sell only to Chaibat at Chaibat's price.

The action then shifts to Kuala Lumpur, Malaysia, where Chaibat's wife, Chen Wen-Shi, is in prison, facing the death penalty for an drug trafficking crime. Chaibat needs to get her out of prison, because only she knows the secret codes to his Swiss bank account, and will not reveal them to him unless freed. Chaibat brings his gang, now including Ka-Kui and Yang, to Kuala Lumpur to stage a jailbreak.

A new difficulty arises when Ka-Kui sees his girlfriend May, a tour guide, in Kuala Lumpur leading a party of Hong Kong tourists. He has told her he's on assignment. Ka-Kui evades May at first, but she sees him at the luxurious hotel where Chaibat's gang are staying, with the beautiful Yang, and confronts him in a jealous rage. This nearly blows Ka-Kui's cover, but Panther is persuaded that May is angry because Ka-Kui tried to proposition her as a prostitute. Later, Ka-Kui gets May alone and explains the situation, and she finally calms down. At one point, May even manages to keep Ka-Kui from inadvertently blowing his own cover. But then, in an elevator, May tells a co-worker about Ka-Kui, and is overheard by one of Panther's men. Chaibat takes May hostage, and forces Ka-Kui and Yang – their cover now blown – to help free Chen.

Chaibat's scheme is successful and May is released, as per their agreement. However, the exchange turns sour when Chaibat pushes May from his helicopter, though she survives. Furious, Ka-Kui and Yang pursue Chaibat and his men over the roads, rooftops (where Ka-Kui and Yang defeat Panther and his partner), and skies of Kuala Lumpur. In the climax on top of a speeding train, Chaibat is killed after his helicopter collides with a bridge and lands on him. Yang and Ka-Kui also recapture Chen, saving her from fatally falling from the train. Chen decides to tell Yang and Ka-Kui the password to Chaibat's bank account. The two partners argue whether Hong Kong or China will get the money.

Cast
 Jackie Chan as RHKP Inspector "Kevin" Chan Ka-Kui / Chen Chia-Chu / Lin Fu Sheng
 Michelle Yeoh (billed as "Michelle Khan") as Interpol Inspector based in Beijing "Jessica" Yang Chien-Hua / Hannah Lin
 Maggie Cheung as May, Kevin's girlfriend
 Bill Tung as "Uncle" Bill Wong, RHKP Senior Superintendent and Kevin's immediate superior
 Philip Chan as Chief Superintendent of Police (Hong Kong) RHKP Chief Superintendent Y.K. Chen
 Yuen Wah as Panther, Chaibat's top lieutenant
 Kenneth Tsang (as Ken Tsang) as Khun Chaibat, narcotics kingpin in Hong Kong
 Josephine Koo as Chen Wen-Shi, Chaibat's wife
 Lo Lieh (as Lit Law) as Thai General, warlord and Golden Triangle drug supplier
 Burt Kwouk provided the voice in the English version (uncredited)
 Kelvin Wong (as Wong Siu) as Peter / Pierre, Chaibat's henchman
 Ken Lo (as Lowei Kwong) as one of Chaibat's henchman (uncredited)
 Allen Sit as one of Chaibat's henchman (uncredited)
 Mars as Hsiung, one of Panther's henchman (uncredited)
 Wai Man Tam (as Wei-min Tan) as Scar Chiang, one of Panther's henchman
 Ming-Sing Wong as Chinese Police Chief Coach Wang (uncredited)
 Wai Shum as Drug Lord #1 at Meeting (uncredited)
 Yi-Sheng Han (as Yee Sang Hon) as Drug Lord #2 at Meeting (uncredited)
 Kim Maree Penn as Blonde Gunwoman (uncredited)

Production
A significant aspect of this film is that it was the first Jackie Chan film from Hong Kong to use sync sound, allowing all the actors' voices to be recorded as they spoke on scene, rather than dubbed over by different actors later.

Exterior scenes were filmed in Hong Kong Island, Shanghai and Kuala Lumpur. Interior scenes were shot in Kuala Lumpur.

According to his book I Am Jackie Chan: My Life in Action, Chan dislocated his cheekbone during a stunt scene.

Filming locations
Victoria Harbour, Central and Western District, Hong Kong Island, British Hong Kong
Nanjing Road and The Bund, Shanghai, People's Republic of China
Sultan Abdul Samad Building, Kuala Lumpur Railway Station, Kuala Lumpur, Klang Valley, Peninsular Malaysia, Malaysia
Brisbane, Queensland, Australia

Dimension version
The Dimension Films version, which was distributed theatrically in North America in 1996, was dubbed into American English with the participation of Jackie Chan and Michelle Yeoh.

Among the changes was the addition of a new score composed and conducted by composer Joel McNeely. Tom Jones' rendition of "Kung Fu Fighting" plays over the end credits, followed by a song specially written and performed for the film by the band Devo, entitled "Supercop".

This release was cut by approximately 10 minutes. These cuts include:
 Scenes of the police superiors getting a briefing about drug-related crimes.
 The police superiors discussing a plan to send Jackie Chan's character on an undercover mission.
 A scene where Yeoh tries to teach Chan about Mainland China.
 A longer version of the meeting with Chaibat in which the sexy women lounging about his mansion are revealed as drug addicts.

Home media
The film was given a theatrical and VHS release in the United Kingdom.

DVD and Blu-ray releases
 In January 1998, Dimension Films released their Supercop version.
 In Hong Kong, the film was initially released by Mega Star Video Distribution (Megastar), and later Deltamac. In 2004, it was re-released by Intercontinental Video Limited (IVL). This version was contained within a Police Story trilogy DVD boxset (Region 0 NTSC). All Hong Kong DVDs contain the original cut.
 In January 2009, the film was re-released in the west by Dragon Dynasty and the Weinstein Company. Although it has the original Hong Kong Cantonese soundtrack, it is cut to fit the visuals of the included Dimension Supercop version. It does not contain any of the scenes specific to the Hong Kong version.
 Hong Kong based company Kam & Ronsom Enterprise released the first three Police Story films on Blu-ray Disc in June 2009.
 In September 2022, Eureka Entertainment released Supercop in the UK as both a stand-alone 1080p Blu-ray release, and as part of a 4K Ultra HD Blu-ray set of the Police Story trilogy. These releases include both the 96 minute Hong Kong theatrical cut and the 91 minute US version, with two audio commentaries on the Hong Kong cut.

Reception

Box office
Police Story 3 grossed HK$32,609,783 in its Hong Kong theatrical run. In Taiwan, it grossed NT$64,576,200 (US$2,607,187). In Japan, it earned  at the box office. In South Korea, it grossed , adding up to  grossed in East Asia.

In the United States, the film was screened in 1993 at the Hogg Memorial Auditorium in Austin, Texas, along with the original Police Story, with both films well-received among Austin audiences at the time. After the North American success of Rumble in the Bronx, Police Story 3 received a wide release in North America on 25 July 1996.  Opening at 1,406 theatres, it grossed US$5,503,176 ($3,914 per screen), on its way to a total gross of US$16,270,600 from  ticket sales.

In France, the film sold 61,402 tickets in 1994, equivalent to an estimated  in gross revenue. In Italy, the film sold 2,385 tickets in 1997, equivalent to an estimated  in gross revenue. In Spain (released 1999), it sold 61,402 tickets, and 1,100 tickets in Romania, equivalent to an estimated  in gross revenue.

Combined, the film grossed an estimated  from the worldwide box office.

Home media
In the United States, the home video release grossed  in video rental revenue during 1997, making it the year's second highest-grossing Dimension rental video (after Scream). This adds up to an estimated  grossed from the box office and US video rentals.

Awards and nominations
 1993 Hong Kong Film Awards
 Nominated: Best Actor (Jackie Chan)
 Nominated: Best Action Choreography (Stanley Tong, Tang Tak-wing, Ailen Sit, Chan Man-ching, Wong Ming-sing)
 1992 Golden Horse Film Festival
 Won: Best Actor (Jackie Chan)
 Won: Best Editing (Peter Cheung, Cheung Ka-Fai)

Critical reception
The North American release by Dimension was well received. The U.S. version of the film holds a "Certified Fresh" rating of 92% on review aggregator Rotten Tomatoes from 53 reviews.

James Berardinelli of website ReelViews wrote:
"As is usual in a Chan film, the end credits (which show out-takes of failed stunts) are one of Police Story 3s highlights. There are more laughs in this hilarious three-minute sequence than in the whole of Kingpin. I can't think of a better reason to stay through the entire movie. Ultimately, the closing montage points out one of the chief differences between Chan's stylized, fast-paced films and those of his American counterparts: this is action with a smile, not a grimace".

In the Washington Post, Richard Harrington said:
"Chan seems to have met his soul mate in Khan [Yeoh's credited name], Asia's top female action star. Like Chan, Khan does her own fighting and stunts. Unlike the Hollywood action contingent, Chan and Khan don't rely on cinematic trickery. Theirs are not special effects, just spectacular ones. Connoisseurs will find Chan's helicopter-train chase far riskier, more exciting and more believable than its mates in Mission: Impossible and The Living Daylights".

Furthermore, in 2009, director Quentin Tarantino named Police Story 3 as one of his favorite films of the past seventeen years. He said that Supercop features the "greatest stunts ever filmed in any movie ever". In 2016 during a roundtable discussion, when asked which movie scene he would love to save for the last of humanity to see, he named the final scene of the movie as his choice.
In 2014, Time Out polled several film critics, directors, actors and stunt actors to list their top action films. Supercop was listed at 75th place on this list.

Spin-off

Michelle Yeoh went on to star in a 1993 spin-off called Supercop 2 or Project S. Though it features a cameo appearance by Jackie Chan and Bill Tung reprises his role as "Uncle" Bill, this film is not a proper part of the Police Story series.

Popular culture
The film inspired two missions in the 2004 videogame Grand Theft Auto: San Andreas, both of which were taken from the film's final scenes. The game's last mission, "End of the Line", in which C.J must chase a firetruck with a red open-top car and catch Sean "Sweet" Johnson, was taken from the scene in which Jackie must chase a van using a red open-top car to catch Jessica Yang (Michelle Yeoh).

The mission "Wrong Side of the Tracks", in which the player must follow a train from a dirt bike, was taken from the scene in which Jessica Yang (Michelle Yeoh) follows the train on a similar dirt bike.

The film briefly appears in a scene in British police comedy film Hot Fuzz in which Danny Butterman sees the film in a supermarket's bargain bin and reads it while Nicholas Angel pursues a shoplifter.

Music

Two songs "I Have My Way" (我有我路向) sung by Jackie Chan and "I Just Want You to Understand" (我只想你懂) sung by Taiwanese musician Jonathan Lee, both lyricized by Hong Kong songwriter James Wong and composed by Lee, are featured as theme songs for the Asian versions of the film.

A soundtrack containing alternative rock and hip hop song was released on 30 July 1996 by Interscope Records. It peaked at #133 on the Billboard 200.

See also

 Jackie Chan filmography
 List of Hong Kong films
 Hong Kong action cinema

References

External links
 
 
 
 
 Review at Kung Fu Cinema
 DVD Comparison from Rewind
 DVD Discussion from Hong Kong Legends

1992 films
1992 action films
1992 martial arts films
1990s Cantonese-language films
Films set in Hong Kong
Films set in Kuala Lumpur
Films set in Malaysia
Films set in Guangzhou
Golden Harvest films
Hong Kong action films
Hong Kong martial arts films
Police detective films
Gun fu films
Police Story (film series)
Films directed by Stanley Tong
1990s police procedural films
1990s Hong Kong films